In the run-up to the next Dutch general election, various organisations are carrying out opinion polling to gauge voting intentions in the Netherlands. Results of such polls are displayed in this list.

The date range for these opinion polls are from the 2021 Dutch general election, held on 15–17 March, to the present day. The next election is scheduled for March 2025. Snap elections occur fairly frequently, having most recently occurred in 2012 Dutch general election.

Four main pollsters perform opinion polls on voting intentions in the Netherlands, these being: I&O Research, Ipsos, Kantar and Peil.nl. No sample sizes or date ranges are provided by Maurice de Hond's Peil.nl; the panel includes approximately 3,000 respondents per week. Peil.nl also does not give percentages, only showing seats while the other pollsters do include percentages.

Projections

Graphical summary 
The averages in the graphs below were constructed using polls listed below conducted by the four major Dutch pollsters. The trendlines show local regressions representing seat totals (not vote percentages).

Seats 
There are 150 seats in total. Parties are denoted with en dashes if no indication is given of their level in polls.

Vote share

See also
 Opinion polling for the 2021 Dutch general election

Notes

References

Dutch
Opinion polling in the Netherlands